Dennis Dale Lewallyn (born August 11, 1953) is a former pitcher in Major League Baseball and current Pitching coach for the AA Mississippi Braves. He played for the Los Angeles Dodgers, Texas Rangers and Cleveland Indians from 1975-1982. Lewallyn's best season was arguably 1977, where he picked up 3 of his 4 career wins. He posted a respectable 4.24 ERA that season and notched his one and only major league save on  September 28, 1977. On that day, Lewallyn pitched 4 innings to hold down a 2-1 Dodgers victory over their arch rival Giants. He saved the game that day for starter Charlie Hough. 

Lewallyn was named as the pitching coach for the AA Mississippi Braves in the Braves organization for the 2018 season.

References

External links

1953 births
Living people
Major League Baseball pitchers
Chipola Indians baseball players
Baseball coaches from Florida
Baseball players from Florida
Los Angeles Dodgers players
Cleveland Indians players
Texas Rangers players
Daytona Beach Dodgers players
Bakersfield Dodgers players
Waterbury Dodgers players
Albuquerque Dukes players
Wichita Aeros players
Charleston Charlies players
San Antonio Dodgers players
Pacific Coast League MVP award winners
Minor league baseball coaches